"The Queen's Bishop" is an Australian TV play. It aired on the ABC as part of Wednesday Theatre.

According to a TV Guide listing, the play is "about a family and their relationships to one another".

Premise
Lady Simpson was the pivot around which her family revolved. Then she died, and the family collapses into a battle for leadership which threaten to tear the family apart. Sir Leonard Simpson tries to replace his lost Queen (Lady Simpson) with his secretary. The rest of the family rallies under the leadership of its Queen, Pauline, the wife of Sir Leonard's eldest son, Bede, to keep out the secretary, who they feel is an outsider.

Cast
 Eve Wyn as Lady Simpson
 John Warwick as Sir Leonard Simpson
 Kay Taylor as his secretary
 Betty Lucas as Queen Pauline
 Ron Graham as Bede Simpson
 Martha Goddard
 Marion Johns
 Sheila Kennelly
 Helen Morse

Production
The show was shot in Sydney.

References

1968 television plays
1968 Australian television episodes
1960s Australian television plays
Wednesday Theatre (season 4) episodes